Sarasota County Sheriff's Office (SSO) is the primary law enforcement agency for Sarasota County, Florida. The agency is responsible for law enforcement services in unincorporated areas of Sarasota County, jail facilities, and courthouse security for Florida's 12th Judicial Circuit. SSO also operates Public Safety Communications (PSC), the county's primary 911 center.

History
The sheriff's office was established in 1921 upon the creation of Sarasota County from the southern portion of Manatee County. Florida Governor Cary A. Hardee appointed Burna Dale "Heinie" Levi as the first Sheriff of Sarasota County that year on July 1, 1921. On August 22, 1921, Sarasota city marshal L.D. Hodges became the agency's first deputy. Hodges would later become elected as sheriff in 1922 as Levi decided not to run in the general election that year. He would begin his tenure in December 1922. 

A sheriff's deputy would be arrested once under charges of having assaulted an African American man named Robert Walthau with his gun and baton on October 23, 1926. The deputy would say he had asked Walthau if he was working and offered him a job unloading some trucks. Walthau would say that this was none of his business and the deputy responded back saying that he should treat him with my more respect because he was white. Mayor Bacon of Sarasota would have no comment when asked by a reporter from the Sarasota Herald but Sheriff Hodges would respond by saying that an investigation would be done and would suspend the deputy if necessary. Between October 18-23, 1926 the Bob Morton Circus would help the Ku Klux Klan hold an event in Sarasota and it is possible that the deputy was encouraged by this.

Sheriff Hodges would end up losing in the Democratic primary on June 5, 1928 to W. Albert Keen. Keen would begin his tenure on January 8, 1929. Three months into his tenure he would get shot along with Special Deputy Walter Whitted while doing a gambling raid in Laurel. Both of them would go to Sarasota Memorial Hospital and Keen ended up getting an amputation on his right leg. He would resume his duties as sheriff in June 1929 and he would continue to serve until he lost a run-off election to Clem Pearson, a former Sarasota Police Department officer and Pearson was sworn in on January 3, 1933.

Pearson would serve until retiring in May 1939 for health reasons with his son B. Douglas "Doug" Pearson who had previously been a deputy for one year took over. He would continue to serve for another 13 years before leaving office in January 1953 when he was defeated by Ross Boyer. Boyer had previously served with the Florida Highway Patrol and had run unsuccessfully for Sheriff in 1948. During Boyer's time in office he would dramatically expand and also modernize the Sheriff's Department. He would also help with creating the Florida Boys Ranch in 1958 and became the president of the National Sheriffs Association in 1969. Boyer would win reelection election four times as a Democrat despite Sarasota County becoming strongly Republican and he would end up retiring in 1972 for health related reasons.

List of Sheriffs 
 Burna D. Levi (July 1, 1921 – December 1922)
 L.D. Hodges (December 1922 – January 8, 1929)
 W. Albert Keen (January 8, 1929 – January 3, 1933)
 Clem Pearson (January 3, 1933 – May 1939)
 B. Douglas "Doug" Pearson (May 1939 – June 1953)
 Ross E. Boyer (January 6, 1953 – January 1973)
 Jim Hardcastle (January 2, 1973 – January 8, 1985)
 Geoffrey Monge (January 8, 1985 – January 2001) 
 William Balkwil (January 2001 – January 9, 2009)
 Thomas M. Knight (January 9, 2009 – January 9, 2021)
Kurt A. Hoffman (January 9, 2021-Present)

Divisions

Law enforcement

Patrol bureau
Deputies in the patrol bureau provide round-the-clock patrol services and answers calls for service in their jurisdiction, which is unincorporated Sarasota County.

Special Operations bureau
The Special Operations division assists the patrol bureau in providing specialized law enforcement services to the county. Divisions within this bureau include:
Agricultural Unit
Animal Services Unit
Aviation Unit
Emergency Response Team (ERT)
Fugitive Apprehension Unit
Hazardous Devices Unit
K-9 Unit
Marine Unit
Mounted Patrol Unit
Sheriff's Underwater Recovery Force (SURF)
Special Weapons and Tactics (SWAT) Unit
Traffic Unit
Youth Services

Investigative bureau
The Investigate Bureau employs detectives along with civilian crime analysts. Divisions within the bureau include:
Criminal Investigations Section
Drug Laboratory
Forensics
Intelligence and Homeland Defense
Special Investigations Section
Special Victims Unit

Specialized units
Deputies may also be assigned to specialized units in addition to their regular duties. These units include:
Bomb Unit
Crisis Negotiation Team
Emergency Response Team
Mounted Patrol
Sheriff's Underwater Recovery Force (SURF)
SWAT Unit

Courts
The agency is responsible for providing court security for all Courthouses and Courtrooms in Sarasota County.

There are two courts in Sarasota County - a courthouse in Venice, as well as the main courthouse in downtown Sarasota. Bailiffs also provided security at the Clerk of Courts building as well as at the Sheriff's Office main headquarters at 2071 Ringling Blvd.

There are several units in the Bailiffs section, to include Security (for the building), Transport and Courtroom security.

Corrections
The Agency is responsible for staffing and maintaining the Sarasota County Jail.

Corrections Deputies are charged with the care, custody & control of inmates in the County facility.

The current jail is located in downtown Sarasota and consists of three interconnected jails. The current inmate census is about 950 inmates.

911 Center
The Sheriff's Office operates Public Safety Communications (PSC), the county's primary 911 center. In addition to dispatching for the Sheriff's Office, it provides law enforcement dispatch to the Sarasota and Venice Police Departments and fire/medical dispatch for the Sarasota County Fire Department, Nokomis Fire Department, Venice Fire Department, North Port Fire Department, and Englewood Fire Department.

Ranks

Vehicle fleet
The agency currently uses police vehicles manufactured by General Motors' Chevrolet brand. The department's patrol fleet primarily consists of the Chevrolet Impala, Chevrolet Caprice PPV, and Chevrolet Tahoe, with undercover cars ranging from Ford Mustang, Toyota Camry, Chevrolet Silverado, Ford F-150 & F-250.

Lawsuits
The sheriff's office has been the subject of numerous lawsuits from both civilians and employees. A civil rights lawsuit by the family of Rodney Mitchell alleges that Sheriff Knight's law enforcement policies are unconstitutional.

Employee retaliation suits
Sergeant Chris Iorio sued the sheriff's office in 2013, claiming that Sheriff Knight retaliated against him for reporting Captain Ron Locke to the Florida Department of Law Enforcement after hearing reports that Locke may have molested an underage girl during the mid-1990s. No charges were filed against Locke.

Captain Richard Mottola, who supervised Iorio, filed a lawsuit in 2014 alleging that Sheriff Knight retaliated against Mottola for failing to punish Iorio.

References

External links
Sarasota County Sheriff's Office official webpage

Sarasota County, Florida
Sheriffs' departments of Florida
1921 establishments in Florida